Paul A. Russell  (born Benjamin Paul Sheeder) (1871–1957) was an outfielder/infielder in Major League Baseball. He played for the St. Louis Browns in 1894.  After his brief MLB appearance he played in the minors from 1896 to 1900 in the Central Pennsylvania League, Interstate League, New England League and Atlantic League. He was also a player/manager in the Interstate League in 1897 and 1898.

External links

1871 births
1957 deaths
Major League Baseball outfielders
Major League Baseball second basemen
Major League Baseball third basemen
St. Louis Browns (NL) players
Baseball players from Pennsylvania
19th-century baseball players
Sunbury Pirates players
New Castle Quakers players
Youngstown Puddlers players
Taunton Herrings players
Manchester Manchesters players
Scranton Miners players
Minor league baseball managers
Sportspeople from Reading, Pennsylvania